The Glenelg Tigers are a defunct basketball team that competed in Australia's National Basketball League (NBL). Formed in 1979, they were a foundation NBL club based in South Australia in the Adelaide suburb of Glenelg. The Tigers lasted only one season before folding due to financial difficulties.

History
When the National Basketball League was formed in 1979, the South Australian Basketball League entered their top two ranked clubs from the 1978 season as their representatives. This included the West Adelaide Bearcats and the Glenelg Tigers. The Tigers played in and won the very first game of the inaugural NBL season on 24 February 1979, defeating the City of Sydney Astronauts 68–65 at a half-full Apollo Stadium in Adelaide. However, they managed just two more wins in the inaugural season and finished second last on the ladder. As a result of the poor result and the financial strain of competing in a national league, the Tigers withdrew from the NBL prior to the start of the 1980 season. They were replaced by fellow South Australian representatives the West Torrens Eagles.

After leaving the NBL, the club maintained a presence in the South Australian State League, currently competing in the Premier League under the name of Southern Tigers.

Season by season

References

External links

Basketball teams established in 1979
Basketball clubs in Adelaide
Defunct National Basketball League (Australia) teams
1979 establishments in Australia
1979 disestablishments in Australia